This is a list of the recipients of the Bangla Academy Literary Award from 1990 to 1999.

1990 
 Mohammad Abdul Qayum
 Jahanara Imam

1991 
 Bipradash Barua
 Habibullah Siraji

1992
 Imdadul Haq Milan
 Muntassir Mamoon

1993
 Bashir Al Helal
 Khaleda Adib Chowdhury

1994
 Wakil Ahmed
 Sikdar Aminul Haq

1995
 Syed Abul Maksud
 Shahriar Kabir

1996
 Moinul Ahsan Saber
 Syed Manzoorul Islam

1997
None

1998
 Sanjida Khatun
 Manju Sarkar

1999
 Nasreen Jahan

References

Bengali literary awards
Bangladeshi literary awards
Lists of award winners
Civil awards and decorations of Bangladesh